was an airline based in Hakodate, Hokkaidō, Japan. It operated domestic feeder flights in Hokkaidō from its main base at Hakodate Airport. The airline was dissolved by parent company All Nippon Airways in July 2006.

History
The airline was established on 5 April 1994 and started operations on 22 July 1994. The airline ceased operations on 31 March 2006 as their sole aircraft was no longer airworthy. Its sole route, Hakodate-Okushiri,  was taken over the next day by Hokkaido Air System, which is owned by competitor Japan Airlines and Air Nippon Network also increased the Hakodate-Sapporo route in the following day. Parent company All Nippon Airways dissolved Air Hokkaido in July 2006.

Fleet

The Air Hokkaido fleet consisted of 2 DHC-6 Twin Otter Series 300 aircraft (at January 2005).

See also
 Hokkaido International Airlines (Air Do), an unrelated company

References

External links

Official website

All Nippon Airways
Defunct airlines of Japan
Airlines established in 1994
Airlines disestablished in 2006
Transport in Hokkaido
Companies based in Hokkaido
Japanese companies established in 1994
Japanese companies disestablished in 2006